Steven Downs (born 8 September 1975) is a former professional tennis player from New Zealand.

Biography
Downs was a leading international junior, who was the world number one doubles player in 1993 and designated ITF World Champion. He reached a final at all four Grand Slam tournaments in 1993. With partner James Greenhalgh, he won two boys' doubles titles, the French Open and Wimbledon Championships. Downs, who played cricket for Auckland up to the Under 14s, made the singles final at the Australian Open and was runner-up to Marcelo Ríos at the US Open, for a year-end number five ranking.

Following his junior success in 1993, Downs turned professional and in 1994 made his first ATP Tour tournament in Auckland. Every year from 1994 to 1997 he featured in the main draw of the Auckland Open. In 1995 he made the round of 16, with a win over the world's 45th-ranked player, Fabrice Santoro.

During his career he participated in three ties for the New Zealand Davis Cup team. In 1995 he made his debut in a tie against Chinese Taipei in Wellington and won both of his singles matches, in a 5–0 whitewash. He was called up again when New Zealand played a World Group qualifier that year in Hamilton, against Switzerland. His first singles match was the opening rubber of the tie, a loss to Marc Rosset. When he and Alistair Hunt lost in the doubles, the tie was lost, although he did win a reverse singles rubber over Jakob Hlasek. In 1996, he played two more singles matches, in a tie against South Korea in Seoul, for losses to Lee Hyung-taik and Yoon Yong-il, but New Zealand still prevailed.

His last ATP Tour appearance in singles came at the 1996 Infiniti Open in Los Angeles, where he lost in the first round to Stefan Edberg. He was runner-up at a Perth Challenger event in 1996. At his peak, Downs was the second-ranked player in New Zealand, behind Brett Steven. A combination of factors, including an elbow injury, brought about an early retirement from professional tennis after the 1997 season.

Junior Grand Slam finals

Singles: 2 (2 runners-up)

Doubles: 2 (2 titles)

ATP Challenger and ITF Futures finals

Singles: 1 (0–1)

Doubles: 1 (0–1)

See also
List of New Zealand Davis Cup team representatives

References

External links
 
 
 

1975 births
Living people
New Zealand male tennis players
French Open junior champions
Wimbledon junior champions
Tennis players from Auckland
Grand Slam (tennis) champions in boys' doubles